The Maniototo Plain, usually simply known as The Maniototo, is an elevated inland region in Otago, New Zealand. The region roughly surrounds the upper reaches of the Taieri River and the Manuherikia River. It is bounded by the Kakanui Range to the north and the Rock and Pillar Range to the southeast. It has a harsh, dry climate, ranging from over 30 °C in mid-summer to -15 °C in mid-winter.

The region is sparsely populated, with the largest centres being Ranfurly, Naseby, Wedderburn and Oturehua.

Part of the Canterbury-Otago tussock grasslands the land surrounding the plain is hilly, with many outcrops of rock which also break up the plain in places.

During the 1860s the region was one of the sites of the Central Otago goldrush, and relics from that era can still be seen around the towns of Kyeburn, Naseby, and St. Bathans.

Sheep farming is the major source of income. The area is closely associated with the sport of curling. Naseby has the only indoor curling rink and the only natural luge track in the Southern Hemisphere.

Demographics

Maniototo had a population of 1,635 at the 2018 New Zealand census, an increase of 81 people (5.2%) since the 2013 census, and an increase of 69 people (4.4%) since the 2006 census. There were 693 households. There were 837 males and 798 females, giving a sex ratio of 1.05 males per female. The median age was 48.2 years (compared with 37.4 years nationally), with 279 people (17.1%) aged under 15 years, 228 (13.9%) aged 15 to 29, 726 (44.4%) aged 30 to 64, and 399 (24.4%) aged 65 or older.

Ethnicities were 90.8% European/Pākehā, 9.5% Māori, 0.7% Pacific peoples, 5.0% Asian, and 1.1% other ethnicities (totals add to more than 100% since people could identify with multiple ethnicities).

The proportion of people born overseas was 11.9%, compared with 27.1% nationally.

Although some people objected to giving their religion, 42.0% had no religion, 49.5% were Christian, 0.2% were Hindu and 1.1% had other religions.

Of those at least 15 years old, 177 (13.1%) people had a bachelor or higher degree, and 327 (24.1%) people had no formal qualifications. The median income was $29,100, compared with $31,800 nationally. 150 people (11.1%) earned over $70,000 compared to 17.2% nationally. The employment status of those at least 15 was that 678 (50.0%) people were employed full-time, 225 (16.6%) were part-time, and 18 (1.3%) were unemployed.

Maniototo County Council 
Maniototo County Council existed between June 1877 and October 1989, when it became part of the Central Otago District Council. The county offices were moved from Naseby to Ranfurly in 1936.

Name
The original Māori name for the area is Māniatoto, "plains of blood", which either referred to the red tussock that covers the landscape or to old battles.

Early Pākehā settlers knew the area as Napiers Plain after Peter Napier, who purchased a run there in the 1850s.

"Maniatoto" was the official name adopted by the Honorary Geographic Board of New Zealand in 1928, but the county council preferred "Maniototo", possibly because it had already installed a large sign with that spelling. 

While the New Zealand Geographic Board reaffirmed the Maniatoto spelling in 1948, it changed the official name to Maniototo in 1954 due to "long and accepted usage".

In popular culture 
In the novel Living in the Maniototo by Janet Frame, the region acts as a metaphor for the 'bloody plain' of the human imagination.

The scenery between Omakau and Ranfurly appeared in Peter Jackson's The Lord of the Rings film trilogy as the location for many of the scenes set in Rohan.

The cast and crew of the Jane Campion film The Power of the Dog which stars Benedict Cumberbatch stayed in Naseby while filming in the Ida Valley in the Maniototo.

See also

Strath-Taieri
Waipiata

References

External links
1889 county map

Landforms of Otago
Central Otago District
Plains of New Zealand
Deserts of New Zealand